Parapsilorhynchus is a genus of cyprinid fishes endemic to India.  There are currently four described species in this genus.

Species
 Parapsilorhynchus discophorus Hora, 1921 (Ratnagiri minnow)
 Parapsilorhynchus elongatus D. F. Singh, 1994
 Parapsilorhynchus prateri Hora & Misra, 1938 (Deolali minnow)
Parapsilorhynchus tentaculatus (Annandale, 1919) (Khandalla minnow)

Parapsilorhynchus alluriensis

References

 

 
Taxa named by Sunder Lal Hora

Freshwater fish genera